Inder Kumar Gujral was sworn in as Prime Minister of India on 21 April 1997. In his initial ministry, the ministers were as follows.

Council of ministers

Cabinet ministers
The cabinet ministers in I. K. Gujral ministry were as follows.

|}

Ministers of State

References

Indian union ministries
1997 establishments in India
Gujral administration
Cabinets established in 1997
1998 disestablishments in India
Cabinets disestablished in 1998
Janata Dal
Communist Party of India
Tamil Maanila Congress
Samajwadi Party
Dravida Munnetra Kazhagam
Asom Gana Parishad
Telugu Desam Party
Jammu & Kashmir National Conference